Nils Teixeira (born 10 July 1990) is a German footballer who plays for Mittelrheinliga club SV Eintracht Hohkeppel as a defender.

Club career
In July 2018, Teixeira joined Cypriot side AEL Limassol.

International career
Teixeira was born in Germany to parents of Portuguese descent. He is a youth international for Germany at various levels.

References

External links
 
 
 

1991 births
Sportspeople from Bonn
Footballers from North Rhine-Westphalia
German people of Portuguese descent
Living people
German footballers
Germany youth international footballers
Association football defenders
Bayer 04 Leverkusen II players
Kickers Offenbach players
FSV Frankfurt players
Dynamo Dresden players
Arminia Bielefeld players
AEL Limassol players
Bonner SC players
2. Bundesliga players
3. Liga players
Regionalliga players
Oberliga (football) players
Cypriot First Division players
German expatriate footballers
Expatriate footballers in Cyprus
German expatriate sportspeople in Cyprus